The Chinese football champions indicates all past winners of the Chinese top-tier football league since it first started in 1951.

The professional football league of China was found in 1994 as the Chinese Jia-A League (甲A联赛). After ten years of existence, the Chinese FA decided to create a new top tier league known as the Chinese Super League.

Since 1994, 29 professional seasons have been contested, with 19 seasons as the Chinese Super League. Dalian Shide and Guangzhou FC are the most successful teams in the professional period with eight titles each. Dalian won three consecutive titles on two occasions (1996–1998 and 2000–2002), while Guangzhou won seven consecutive titles from 2011 to 2017.

List of champions
Italic indicates defunct clubs.

National Football Championship (1951–1953)

National Football League (1954–1955)

National Football Jia League (1956–1962)

National Football League (1963)

National Football Jia League (1964–1965)

National Football League (1973–1977)

National Football Jia League (1978–1986)

Jia-A League champions (1987–1993)
 Semi-professional era

Jia-A League champions (1994–2003)
 Professional era

Super League champions (2004–present)

Total titles won
Teams in bold compete in the Chinese Super League as of the 2023 season. Italics indicates defunct clubs.

Total titles won by city/town
Professional era only (1994–present)

Total titles won by region
Professional era only (1994–present)

References

External links
List of champions at RSSSF

Football in China
China
Champions